Bernhard Eisenstuck (20 September 1805, Annaberg-Buchholz, Electorate of Saxony – 5 April 1871), factory co-owner and president of the Chenmitz town council, was a prominent agitator for a trade policy, when only in the sense of a protective tariff.  In 1848, he was a member of the Frankfurt preliminary parliament (Vorparlament) and then elected from Chemnitz to the succeeding Frankfurt parliament where he sat on the left. In May he was sent as an imperial commissioner to the insurgent Palatinate, but recalled for overstepping his authority.  He was vice president of the leftovers of the Frankfurt parliament (Rumpfparlament) when it emigrated to Stuttgart.  Before its forced dispersal, he resigned and went to Belgium.  After a long absence, he returned home and was a representative in Saxony's parliament where his name and decisive stance lent prestige to the thinly populated liberal ranks. He died as director of a thread-spinning factory.

References 
Heinrich Theodor Flathe, “Eisenstuck, Bernhard” in Allgemeine Deutsche Biographie, Band 5 (Leipzig, 1877), S. 775. 
Carl Schurz, Reminiscences (3 volumes), New York: The McClure Company, 1907.  Schurz mentions Eisenstuck in Volume One (pp. 182–183):  “The terrible confusion which the refusal of the king of Prussia to accept the imperial crown under the national constitution had brought upon all Germany came now to light in an almost grotesque manner. As already mentioned, the national parliament had, on 4 May, summoned ‘the governments, the legislative bodies, the communes of the several German states, the whole German people, to see to it that the constitution of the German Empire be generally recognized and practically introduced.’ Inasmuch as the king of Bavaria would not recognize the national constitution, the Pfaelzers felt themselves justified in rising against the Bavarian government, for they only obeyed the national parliament, which they regarded as the highest national authority in Germany. The ‘Committee for the Defense of the Country,’ therefore, quite logically applied to the national parliament through their representatives in that body, and to the national central power, for recognition, protection, and support. The national central power, at the head of which stood the Austrian Archduke Johann, thereupon sent an imperial commissioner, Dr. Eisenstuck, to the Palatinate with the instruction ‘to take in the name of the imperial power all measures necessary for the restoration of the laws in that country,’ and especially to see to it that some of the resolutions adopted by the ‘Committee for the Defense of the Country’ be rescinded. The imperial commissioner, after due investigation, declared those resolutions to be invalid, but he recognized the ‘Committee for the Defense of the Country’ and for the execution of the national constitution as fully competent to organize an armed power and to swear in the members thereof to obey the national constitution, and in case of necessity to defend that constitution by independent action against all attacks by force. With this, of course, Archduke Johann, who had sent him, was not pleased.”

1805 births
1871 deaths
People from Annaberg-Buchholz
Businesspeople from Saxony
People of the Revolutions of 1848
Members of the Second Chamber of the Diet of the Kingdom of Saxony